The Swedish Nuclear Fuel and Waste Management Company (Svensk Kärnbränslehantering Aktiebolag, abbreviated SKB) is a company founded by the Swedish nuclear power industry. Among its primary operations are the management and disposal of nuclear waste and expended nuclear fuel. Its main offices are in Stockholm, but the company has sites in Forsmark and Oskarshamn (Äspölaboratoriet and Kapsellaboratoriet). The nuclear waste disposal vessel M/S Sigyn is owned SKB.

Owners

Board of directors

References

External links
 Official web site

Nuclear power companies of Sweden
Nuclear waste companies
Waste management in Sweden
Companies based in Solna Municipality